Octonodula is a genus of moth in the family Gelechiidae.

Species
 Octonodula binotella Janse, 1951
 Octonodula inumbrata (Meyrick, 1914)

References

Anacampsinae